Bates Cooke (December 23, 1787 – May 31, 1841) was an American lawyer and politician.

Life
He was the son of Captain Lemuel Cooke who had fought in the American Revolutionary War. Bates and his brother Lathrop participated in the War of 1812.

Bates Cooke was Supervisor of the Town of Cambria, New York in 1814. Then he studied law, was admitted to the bar about 1815 and commenced practice in Lewiston.

He was elected as an Anti-Mason to the 22nd United States Congress, and served from March 4, 1831 to March 3, 1833.

Bates and Lathrop Cooke were partners of the Lewiston Railroad Company, which connected with the Lockport and Niagara Falls Railroad in 1835.

He was New York State Comptroller from 1839 to January 1841 when he resigned because of his bad health.  Subsequently, he was appointed a bank commissioner and died in office soon after.

He was buried at the Oak Wood Cemetery in Lewiston.

Sources

Google Books The New York Civil List compiled by Franklin Benjamin Hough (pages 34 and 39; Weed, Parsons and Co., 1858) (giving the impression that Cooke was appointed bank commissioner in May 1840, but in fact he was appointed ["under the act of May 1840"] only after his resignation as Comptroller)
Bates Cooke on Political Graveyard
An episode from the Revolutionary War, in The New York Times on April 8, 1883 (PDF)
Lewiston history

External links

 Historic houses in Lewiston, among them Cooke's on 755 Center Street

1787 births
1841 deaths
People from Wallingford, Connecticut
Anti-Masonic Party members of the United States House of Representatives from New York (state)
New York State Comptrollers
People from Lewiston, New York
19th-century American railroad executives
American people of the War of 1812
New York (state) lawyers
Town supervisors in New York (state)
19th-century American politicians